This is a list of Malaysian films produced and released in 2022. Most of these films are produced in the Malay language, but there also a significant number of them that are produced in Tamil, English, and Mandarin.

Malay Language Movie

Tamil Language Movie

Punjabi Language Movie
 Mundey Kampung Dey - First Punjabi language movie produced in Malaysia.

References

Malaysia
2022
2022 in Malaysia